Sycamore Creek may refer to:

Sycamore Creek (Contra Costa County), a stream in California
Sycamore Creek (Kings River), a stream in California
Sycamore Creek (Santa Clara County), a stream in California
Sycamore Creek (Michigan), a stream in Michigan
Sycamore Creek (Crabtree Creek tributary), a stream in North Carolina
Sycamore Creek (Kinney County, Texas), a stream in Texas
Sycamore Creek (Tarrant County, Texas)

See also
Sycamore Branch